Tudu is a small borough in Vinni Parish, Lääne-Viru County, in northeastern Estonia.

At the 2011 Census, the settlement's population was 302, of which the Estonians were 291 (96.4%).

There are a kindergarten-primary school, Lutheran church and a course of culture located in Tudu.

In the 19th century a glass factory was opened in Tudu. It was closed in 1879.

The Sonda–Mustvee railway passed through Tudu from 1926 to 1973.

See also
Lake Tudu

References

Boroughs and small boroughs in Estonia